Mathew Ryan Jones (born 30 November 1995) is an English footballer.

Playing career
Jones came through the youth system of his hometown club, Swindon Town, where he signed as an 11-year-old. In March 2014, Jones was sent on a work experience loan to Swindon Supermarine but he returned to his parent club and made his professional football debut on the final day of the 2013–14 season as a second-half substitute against Rotherham United.

Career statistics

Club

Personal life
He is the son of the former Aberdeen, Swindon Town and Reading midfielder Tom Jones.

References

External links

1995 births
Living people
Sportspeople from Swindon
English footballers
Association football defenders
Swindon Town F.C. players
Swindon Supermarine F.C. players
Wantage Town F.C. players
Chippenham Town F.C. players
Farnborough F.C. players
English Football League players
Southern Football League players